Ildırı is a picturesque sea-side village on the Aegean Sea coast belonging to the administrative district of Çeşme in Turkey's İzmir Province, and located about twenty-five kilometers north of Çeşme town, facing Chios.

The important Ancient Greek city of Erythrai was located here from the Hellenistic period, and throughout the ancient Roman and Byzantine periods. The ruins are situated within the modern-day village and the site was explored in depth in the 1960s by Professor Ekrem Akurgal, leading to valuable discoveries, but has since been somewhat neglected.

Despite being close to Çeşme, the village has not been affected by the tourism boom that has overtaken its administrative center, and a calm and introverted lifestyle prevails in the village, supplemented only by a number of summer-house owners and retirees, mostly from İzmir.

References 

Ancient Greek archaeological sites in Turkey
Roman sites in Turkey
Villages in Çeşme District